Michele Antonelli (born 23 May 1994) is an Italian male racewalker, which participated at the 2017 World Championships in Athletics.

Biography
He was the Italian champion at senior level of 50 km race walk in 2016 and bronze in the 2017 European Race Walking Cup in 50 km (Poděbrady 21 May 2017). He has the third all-time Italian performance under 23 of the 50 km behind Alex Schwazer and Gianni Perricelli. In 2018, he competed in the men's 50 kilometres walk at the 2018 European Athletics Championships held in Berlin, Germany. He did not finish his race.

Achievements

National titles
Italian Athletics Championships
50 km walk: 2016, 2019

References

External links
 

1994 births
Living people
Italian male racewalkers
World Athletics Championships athletes for Italy
Athletics competitors of Centro Sportivo Aeronautica Militare
21st-century Italian people